The year 1806 in archaeology involved some significant events.

Explorations

Excavations

Finds

Publications
 Saggio delle lingue Italia  by Luigi Lanzi
 Dei vasi antichi dipinti volgarmente chiamati Etruschi by Luigi Lanzi

Births

Deaths
 September 18 – Hayman Rooke, British army officer and antiquarian (born 1723)

Archaeology
Archaeology by year
Archaeology
Archaeology